Sidney Kingsley  (22 October 1906 – 20 March 1995) was an American dramatist. He received the Pulitzer Prize for Drama for his play Men in White in 1934.

Life and career 
Kingsley was born Sidney Kirschner in New York. He studied at Cornell University, where he began his career writing plays for the college dramatic club. He joined the Group Theater for the production of his first major work. In 1933 the company performed his play Men in White. Set in a hospital, the play dealt with the issue of illegal abortion, 1930s medical and surgical practices, and the struggle of one promising physician who must choose to dedicate his life to medicine or devote himself to his fiancée.  The play was a box-office smash.

Kingsley followed this success with the play Dead End in 1935, a story about slum housing and its connection to crime. The play was fairly successful, eventually spawning the film Dead End Kids. In 2022, Dead End was adapted as a musical and released as a concept album (aka audiobook musical). "Dead End the Musical" was written by Neil Fishman (Music), Harvey Edelman (Lyrics), and Peter C. Palame (Book). Kingsley's two successful plays were followed by his 1936 anti-war play Ten Million Ghosts and his 1939 The World We Make, which were flops and had short runs.

Despite reaching the rank of lieutenant in the United States Army during World War II, soon after 1951 HUAC put Kingsley's name on the Hollywood Blacklist. Being on the Blacklist is the main reason he never had a Hollywood film adaption after 1951.

In 1943, Kingsley returned to his previous success with the historical drama The Patriots. This play, which told the story of Thomas Jefferson and his activities in the young American republic, won the New York Drama Critics Circle Award for Best Play. Kingsley continued writing for the theater late into his career, adapting Arthur Koestler's novel Darkness at Noon for the stage in 1951, and writing Lunatics and Lovers in 1954 and Night Life in 1962.

In addition to his work for the stage, Kingsley wrote a number of scripts for Hollywood productions, mostly based on his own work. He later also wrote the scripts and templates for numerous television series and television films.

His marriage to actress Madge Evans in 1939 lasted until her death in 1981. The couple lived together in their 18th century Oakland, New Jersey home for 42 years.

Meeting him in 1957, Michael Korda described Kingsley as "a short, powerfully built man with broad shoulders, a big head, and rough-hewn features that made him look like a bust by Sir Jacob Epstein. Kingsley hired Korda as an assistant to do research for a screenplay he was writing for CBS on the Hungarian Revolution which was eventually canceled.

In 1964, Kingsley was elected president of the Dramatists Guild of America and in 1983, he was inducted into the American Theater Hall of Fame.

Kingsley died of a stroke on March 20, 1995, in his home in Oakland, New Jersey.

Works 
 1933: Men in White
 1935: Dead End
 1936: Ten Million Ghosts
 1939: The World We Make
 1943: The Patriots
 1949: Detective Story
 1951: Darkness at Noon (stage & TV adaptation)
 1954: Lunatics and Lovers
 1962: Night Life

Editions of Works 
 Sidney Kingsley: Five Prizewinning Plays. Ohio State University Press, Columbus OH 1995.  (Digitized full access on the publisher's page)

Filmography

^film never produced

Awards
 1934 Pulitzer Prize for Best Drama for Men in White.

References

External links 
 
 
 Page at Spartacus Educational
 Sidney Kingsley Papers - Ohio State University Libraries

1906 births
1995 deaths
American male screenwriters
Cornell University alumni
Pulitzer Prize for Drama winners
Jewish American dramatists and playwrights
Edgar Award winners
Writers from Queens, New York
Townsend Harris High School alumni
20th-century American dramatists and playwrights
American male dramatists and playwrights
People from Oakland, New Jersey
20th-century American male writers
Screenwriters from New York (state)
Screenwriters from New Jersey
20th-century American screenwriters